The Evan Andreas Sather House is a historic house located at 7 NW Tumalo Avenue in Bend, Oregon. It is locally significant for its high artistic value and for its distinctive characteristics of the Craftsman style.

Description and history 
The two-story, single-family house was completed in 1911 in the American Craftsman style. The 31' x 40' plan sits on a stone foundation of native ‘Tuff’ rock, most likely quarried on site. Excavation and stone work was completed by H. Caler. It was constructed using standard balloon-frame construction and is clad with six-inch, horizontal, tongue and groove, drop siding.

It was listed on the National Register of Historic Places on June 27, 1997.

See also
 National Register of Historic Places listings in Deschutes County, Oregon

References

1911 establishments in Oregon
Bungalow architecture in Oregon
Houses completed in 1911
Houses on the National Register of Historic Places in Bend, Oregon
American Craftsman architecture in Oregon